Januar is the debut studio album by Serbian recording artist Ana Nikolić. It was released on 23 August 2003 by City Records. Nikolić worked with several producers on the album, mainly Aleksandar Milić Mili who is known for his work with Serbian folk singer Ceca Ražnatović. All of the songs were written by Marina Tucaković, and they mainly talk about passion and cheating. Musically, the album drew inspiration from European pop sound incorporating music genres of the Balkans region.

For songs "Vatra" and "" Ana filmed extremely effective and high quality videos.

Track listing

References

2003 albums
Ana Nikolić albums